Dalton Township is a civil township of Muskegon County in the U.S. state of Michigan.  As of the 2000 census, the township population was 8,047.

History
Dalton Township was established in 1859.

Communities
Lakewood Club is a village on US 31 in the northwest corner of the township.
Twin Lake is an unincorporated community and census-designated place on M-120 in the northeast part of the township with ZIP code 49457.
Califf Station was a depot on the Chicago and West Michigan Railroad beginning in 1874.

History
Dalton Township was established in 1859.

Geography

Demographics
As of the census of 2000, there were 8,047 people, 2,871 households, and 2,247 families residing in the township. The racial makeup of the township was 93.34% White, 2.31% African American, 1.30% Native American, 0.20% Asian, 0.93% from other races, and 1.91% from two or more races. Hispanic or Latino of any race were 2.87% of the population.

There were 2,871 households, out of which 39.9% had children under the age of 18 living with them, 63.6% were married couples living together, 9.4% had a female householder with no husband present, and 21.7% were non-families. 17.4% of all households were made up of individuals, and 6.1% had someone living alone who was 65 years of age or older.  The average household size was 2.80 and the average family size was 3.14.

In the township the population was spread out, with 29.0% under the age of 18, 8.7% from 18 to 24, 30.3% from 25 to 44, 23.5% from 45 to 64, and 8.4% who were 65 years of age or older.  The median age was 34 years. For every 100 females, there were 103.9 males.  For every 100 females age 18 and over, there were 100.4 males.

The median income for a household in the township was $47,127, and the median income for a family was $50,096. Males had a median income of $37,743 versus $25,433 for females. The per capita income for the township was $18,036.  About 3.8% of families and 5.9% of the population were below the poverty line, including 5.6% of those under age 18 and 7.0% of those age 65 or over.

References

External links
Dalton Township

Townships in Muskegon County, Michigan
1859 establishments in Michigan
Populated places established in 1859
Townships in Michigan